Lars Valerian Ahlfors (18 April 1907 – 11 October 1996) was a Finnish mathematician, remembered for his work in the field of Riemann surfaces and his text on complex analysis.

Background
Ahlfors was born in Helsinki, Finland. His mother, Sievä Helander, died at his birth. His father, Axel Ahlfors, was a professor of engineering at the Helsinki University of Technology. The Ahlfors family was Swedish-speaking, so he first attended the private school Nya svenska samskolan where all classes were taught in Swedish. Ahlfors studied at University of Helsinki from 1924, graduating in 1928 having studied under Ernst Lindelöf and Rolf Nevanlinna. He assisted Nevanlinna in 1929 with his work on Denjoy's conjecture on the number of asymptotic values of an entire function.
In 1929 Ahlfors published the first proof of this conjecture, now known as the Denjoy–Carleman–Ahlfors theorem. It states that the number of asymptotic values approached by an entire function of order ρ along curves in the complex plane going toward infinity is less than or equal to 2ρ.

He completed his doctorate from the University of Helsinki in 1930.

Career
Ahlfors worked as an associate professor at the University of Helsinki from 1933 to 1936. In 1936 he was one of the first two people to be awarded the Fields Medal (the other was Jesse Douglas). In 1935 Ahlfors visited Harvard University. He returned to Finland in 1938 to take up a professorship at the University of Helsinki. The outbreak of war in 1939 led to problems although Ahlfors was unfit for military service. He was offered a position at the Swiss Federal Institute of Technology at Zurich in 1944 and finally managed to travel there in March 1945. He did not enjoy his time in Switzerland, so in 1946 he jumped at a chance to leave, returning to work at Harvard, where he remained until his retirement in 1977; he was William Caspar Graustein Professor of Mathematics from 1964. Ahlfors was a visiting scholar at the Institute for Advanced Study in 1962 and again in 1966. He was awarded the Wihuri Prize in 1968 and the Wolf Prize in Mathematics in 1981. He served as the Honorary President of the International Congress of Mathematicians in 1986 at Berkeley, California, in celebration of his 50th year of the award of his Fields Medal

His book Complex Analysis (1953) is the classic text on the subject and is almost certainly referenced in any more recent text which makes heavy use of complex analysis. Ahlfors wrote several other significant books, including Riemann surfaces (1960) and Conformal invariants (1973).
He made decisive contributions to meromorphic curves, value distribution theory, Riemann surfaces, conformal geometry, quasiconformal mappings and other areas during his career.

Personal life
In 1933, he married Erna Lehnert, an Austrian who with her parents had first settled in Sweden and then in Finland. The couple had three daughters. Ahlfors died of pneumonia at the Willowwood nursing home in Pittsfield, Massachusetts in 1996.

See also

Ahlfors finiteness theorem
Ahlfors function
Ahlfors measure conjecture
Beurling–Ahlfors transform
Schwarz–Ahlfors–Pick theorem
Measurable Riemann mapping theorem

Bibliography
Articles
 Ahlfors, Lars V. An extension of Schwarz's lemma. Trans. Amer. Math. Soc. 43 (1938), no. 3, 359–364. doi:10.2307/1990065
 Ahlfors, Lars; Beurling, Arne. Conformal invariants and function-theoretic null-sets. Acta Math. 83 (1950), 101–129. doi:10.1007/BF02392634
 Beurling, A.; Ahlfors, L. The boundary correspondence under quasiconformal mappings. Acta Math. 96 (1956), 125–142. doi:10.1007/BF02392360
 Ahlfors, Lars; Bers, Lipman. Riemann's mapping theorem for variable metrics. Ann. of Math. (2) 72 (1960), 385–404. doi:10.2307/1970141
 Ahlfors, Lars Valerian. Collected papers. Vol. 1. 1929–1955. Edited with the assistance of Rae Michael Shortt. Contemporary Mathematicians. Birkhäuser, Boston, Mass., 1982. xix+520 pp. 
 Ahlfors, Lars Valerian. Collected papers. Vol. 2. 1954–1979. Edited with the assistance of Rae Michael Shortt. Contemporary Mathematicians. Birkhäuser, Boston, Mass., 1982. xix+515 pp. 
Books
  Ahlfors, Lars V. Complex analysis. An introduction to the theory of analytic functions of one complex variable. Third edition. International Series in Pure and Applied Mathematics. McGraw-Hill Book Co., New York, 1978. xi+331 pp. 
 Ahlfors, Lars V. Conformal invariants. Topics in geometric function theory. Reprint of the 1973 original. With a foreword by Peter Duren, F. W. Gehring and Brad Osgood. AMS Chelsea Publishing, Providence, RI, 2010. xii+162 pp. 
 Ahlfors, Lars V. Lectures on quasiconformal mappings. Second edition. With supplemental chapters by C. J. Earle, I. Kra, M. Shishikura and J. H. Hubbard. University Lecture Series, 38. American Mathematical Society, Providence, RI, 2006. viii+162 pp. 
 Ahlfors, Lars V. Möbius transformations in several dimensions. Ordway Professorship Lectures in Mathematics. University of Minnesota, School of Mathematics, Minneapolis, Minn., 1981. ii+150 pp.
 Ahlfors, Lars V.; Sario, Leo. Riemann surfaces. Princeton Mathematical Series, No. 26 Princeton University Press, Princeton, N.J. 1960 xi+382 pp.

References

External links

 Ahlfors entry on Harvard University Mathematics department web site.
Papers of Lars Valerian Ahlfors : an inventory (Harvard University Archives)
Lars Valerian Ahlfors The MacTutor History of Mathematics page about Ahlfors
The Mathematics of Lars Valerian Ahlfors, Notices of the American Mathematical Society; vol. 45, no. 2 (February 1998).
Lars Valerian Ahlfors (1907–1996), Notices of the American Mathematical Society; vol. 45, no. 2 (February 1998).

National Academy of Sciences Biographical Memoir
Author profile in the database zbMATH

1907 births
1996 deaths
20th-century Finnish mathematicians
Academic staff of the Helsinki University of Technology
Finnish emigrants to the United States
Complex analysts
Fields Medalists
Foreign Members of the Russian Academy of Sciences
Foreign Members of the USSR Academy of Sciences
Harvard University faculty
Institute for Advanced Study visiting scholars
Mathematical analysts
Members of the United States National Academy of Sciences
People from Uusimaa Province (Grand Duchy of Finland)
People from Winchester, Massachusetts
Swedish-speaking Finns
Wolf Prize in Mathematics laureates
Members of the Royal Swedish Academy of Sciences